The third season of CSI: NY originally aired on CBS between September 2006 and May 2007. It consisted of 24 episodes. Its regular time slot continued on Wednesdays at 10pm/9c.

Episode 22, "Cold Reveal", crossed over with a visiting character from Cold Case.

CSI: NY The Complete Third Season was released on DVD in the U.S. on October 9, 2007.

Cast

Main cast
Gary Sinise as Mac Taylor
Melina Kanakaredes as Stella Bonasera
Carmine Giovinazzo as Danny Messer
Anna Belknap as Lindsay Monroe
Hill Harper as Sheldon Hawkes
Eddie Cahill as Don Flack

Recurring cast
Robert Joy as Sid Hammerback
A. J. Buckley as Adam Ross
Emmanuelle Vaugier as Jessica Angell
Claire Forlani as Peyton Driscoll
Kyle Gallner as Reed Garrett

Episodes

References

External links

CSI: NY Season 3 Episode List on Internet Movie Database
CSI: NY Season 3 Episode Guide on CSI Files
CSI: New York on CBS on The Futon Critic

2006 American television seasons
2007 American television seasons
03